Alvaro de Toledo (1921 – 5 January 1997) was a Brazilian equestrian. He competed in two events at the 1952 Summer Olympics.

References

External links

1921 births
1997 deaths
Brazilian male equestrians
Olympic equestrians of Brazil
Equestrians at the 1952 Summer Olympics
Place of birth missing